
Saint-Léonard underground lake (French Lac souterrain de Saint-Léonard) is located at Saint Léonard in the canton of Valais, Switzerland.

Geography 
It is formed where a bed of Triassic gypsum, emplaced within impervious Carboniferous strata, has been dissolved by groundwater. With a length of 300 and a width of 20 m it is the largest underground lake in Europe. It was discovered in 1943 by Jean-Jacques Pittard. Prior to 1946 the water-level was much higher, but an earthquake with a force of 5.6 on the Richter-scale opened additional fissures in the cave on January 25, 1946 made it more readily navigable. The lake is accessible by the public since 1949. Visits are organized daily from March 15 to November 1, from 9 am to 5 pm. The visit is about half an hour long, and is held in English, French, German and Italian. Ticket-prices are 12 CHF for adults and 7 CHF for children.

Access to the lake was closed from 2000 to June 2003, whilst the stability of the site was improved by the addition of more than 5000 bolts driven into the ceiling.

References

External links

Website of the lake
Subterranean lake comes back from the dead

Caves of Switzerland
Show caves in Switzerland
Lakes of Valais
Underground lakes
Gypsum caves
Tourist attractions in Valais
Landforms of Valais